Desevio Ilan Payne (born 30 November 1995) is an American soccer player who plays as a defender for Dutch club Koninklijke HFC.

Early and personal life
Payne was born in Greenwood, South Carolina, where his Trinidadian father met his Dutch mother at Lander University. His parents moved to the Netherlands when he was one year old, where he grew up.

Career

Club career
Payne made his professional debut on 22 February 2015, in the Eredivisie against Heerenveen.

International career
Payne is eligible to represent the United States and the Netherlands. Payne represented the United States at the 2015 FIFA U-20 World Cup.

References

External links
 
 

1995 births
Living people
People from Greenwood, South Carolina
American people of Dutch descent
American sportspeople of Trinidad and Tobago descent
African-American soccer players
American soccer players
Soccer players from South Carolina
Association football defenders
FC Groningen players
Excelsior Rotterdam players
FC Emmen players
Koninklijke HFC players
Eredivisie players
Tweede Divisie players
American emigrants to the Netherlands
Dutch footballers
Trinidad and Tobago footballers
United States men's under-20 international soccer players
American expatriate soccer players
American expatriate sportspeople in the Netherlands
Expatriate footballers in the Netherlands
21st-century African-American sportspeople